AFL Darling Downs is an Australian rules football competition based in the Darling Downs region of Queensland including its major city of Toowoomba. The competition was formed as the Darling Downs Australian Football League in 1971. The senior representative team is known as the Demons and wear guernseys modelled on the Melbourne Demons guernseys.

History of Australian Football in the Darling Downs, Queensland 
The Warwick Football Club was formed in 1873 in Warwick to play under Australian rules, however lacking any nearby competitors for 3 years it played mostly intra-club scratch matches until Brisbane club Civil Service travelled to Toowoomba to play against a newly formed Toowoomba Football Club in 1876. AFL Queensland cites the Toowoomba Football Club as forming in 1873, however few sources back this up. As the game spread further west of the Great Divide clubs were split on whether to adopt rugby or Australian rules. Nevertheless, it is noted that clubs from the region in this era were able to hold their own against those from Brisbane. A Toowoomba Football Association formed in 1876 teams were 16-a-side however the rules used were not fully documented and some suggest it could have been an early rugby association which would be contemporary with the code being introduced to Brisbane. The Light Infantry Corps formed to play against the Light Infantry Football Club. The Association disappeared a couple of years later. As Downs clubs lacked nearby opponents rugby was more suited to facilitating matches against New South Wales clubs, as a result local competition went into recess. An exception was an 1878 match between Old-Victorians and All Comers played in front of a large crowd.  The Queensland Football Association formed in 1880 and affiliated with the Victorian Football Association, however clubs outside of Brisbane were becoming increasingly frustrated by the lack of representation for the whole colony. In 1881 matches were once again played in Toowoomba when the Toowoomba Grammar took up the sport. By 1882, a Toowoomba Association (affiliated with the QFA) had re-formed including both clubs and schools in the region. In 1883, a team of 12 travelled from Excelsior FC (Brisbane), noting a revival of the code in the region. The inclusion of the Allora Football Club at Allora in 1883 provided more regular interaction between the clubs. However the code suffered a major blow when, after the Brisbane private school association in 1887 voted to switch to rugby including Toowoomba Grammar. A senior Toowoomba Rugby Football Club formed in 1887and this was the last mention of the Toowoomba Football Club or any other Downs clubs playing Australian rules. After the collapse of the QFA in 1890 the Toowoomba Rugby Association and Toowoomba British Football Association were able to grow unopposed.

Modern Competition
The Darling Downs Australian Football League was first played as an official organised competition in 1971. Signals, Coolaroo and Aviation were the three foundation clubs and were joined by a fourth club, South Toowoomba in 1972.

The League has had many changes to the number of clubs participating since then, with ten A Grade Senior Clubs currently competing, and now known as AFL Darling Downs.  It is the largest regional League in Queensland. There are four Senior clubs based in Toowoomba, and the other senior clubs come from Dalby, Goondiwindi, Highfields, and Warwick. New teams from Kingaroy, and Chinchilla are participating in the 2013 revamped competition.

University Cougars AFC is the most successful club with 13 premierships, 4 under the banner of "Institute Eagles" and 5 under the moniker of "University Eagles". Coolaroo Roos has 9 premierships and Goondiwindi Hawks has 8. South Toowoomba Bombers (formerly Longhorns) and Toowoomba Tigers (formerly Pinkies) have 6 premiership flags each.

AFL Darling Downs Senior Clubs 

There have been many different towns in the Darling Downs of Queensland fielding Australian Rules Football teams over the forty plus years of Senior Competition. Coolaroo Roos have played every season from the inaugural year, and Toowoomba Tigers have played the second most seasons.  Below is a full list of Current and Former Clubs in the region.

Current Senior Clubs 

Notes

Former Senior Clubs 

NOTE:  Some clubs listed above played in Reserve Grade (Division 2) only for many seasons, but were not part of the A Grade competition and those years are not included in the above table.

AFL Darling Downs A Grade Premiers List 

 1971 Signals
 1972 South Toowoomba Longhorns
 1973 Aviation
 1974 Aviation
 1975 Coolaroo Roos
 1976 South Toowoomba Longhorns
 1977 Toowoomba Pinkies
 1978 Institute Eagles
 1979 Toowoomba Pinkies
 1980 Goondiwindi Hawks
 1981 South Toowoomba Longhorns
 1982 South Toowoomba Longhorns
 1983 Goondiwindi Hawks
 1984 South Toowoomba Longhorns
 1985 Lockyer Valley Magpies
 1986 Institute Eagles
 1987 Institute Eagles

 1988 Toowoomba Tigers
 1989 Institute Eagles
 1990 University Eagles
 1991 Goondiwindi Hawks
 1992 University Eagles
 1993 Lockyer Valley Magpies
 1994 University Eagles
 1995 Goondiwindi Hawks
 1996 Goondiwindi Hawks
 1997 University Eagles
 1998 University Eagles
 1999 Goondiwindi Hawks
 2000 Goondiwindi Hawks
 2001 Coolaroo Roos
 2002 Coolaroo Roos
 2003 Coolaroo Roos
 2004 Coolaroo Roos

 2005 Coolaroo Roos
 2006 University Cougars
 2007 University Cougars
 2008 South Toowoomba Bombers
 2009 Coolaroo Roos
 2010 Toowoomba Tigers
 2011 Toowoomba Tigers
 2012 Toowoomba Tigers
 2013 Coolaroo Roos
 2014 Warwick Redbacks
 2015 Coolaroo Roos
 2016 University Cougars
 2017 University Cougars
 2018 University Cougars
 2019 Goondiwindi Hawks
 2020 South Toowoomba Bombers
 2021 South Toowoomba Bombers

AFL Darling Downs A Grade Grand Final Results

Inaugural Darling Downs AFL Grand Final Results 

GOALS:Signals - B.Fletcher 2, W. Sampson, T. Osborne, M. Darby.
Coolaroo Roos - A. Jericho 2, I. Shaw, J. Oska.
BEST:Signals - T. Osborne, D. Akesson, J. Davis, J. Walsh, K. Zeller.
Coolaroo Roos - R. Smith, J. Hagerstrom, J. Smith, A. Jericho, C. Wells.

AFL Darling Downs Premiership Tables and Finals Results 

Below is a summary of AFL Darling Downs A Grade Ladders at the end of the home and away fixtures, and the Finals Results for the major rounds:

2006 Ladder

2007 Ladder

2008 Ladder

2009 Ladder

2010 Ladder

2011 Ladder

2012 Ladder

2013 Ladder

AFL Darling Downs Best and Fairest Award (Holman Medalist)

Reserve Grade 
The Reserve Grade competition ran from 1975 to 1999, and 2001, before player numbers for some clubs became a problem and therefore the "Adrian Jericho Trophy" had not been contested for a full decade.

In 2012, the Reserves competition returned with a three team competition involving University, Coolaroo, and Souths. It was the first time the competition has been staged since Kingaroy defeated Coolaroo in the 2001 Grand Final.

South Toowoomba Longhorns are the most successful team in Reserve Grade with 10 Premierships from 14 Grand Finals.
University (Institute) are the next best with 8 flags from 11 Grand Finals.

Reserve Grade (Division 2) Grand Final Results

Future of AFL Darling Downs 

The Reserve Grade or a Division 2 Competition will resume as soon as the competition can gain enough interest once again.

The League has the potential to expand to 12 Senior Clubs if these areas can field enough players, and with Junior competitions also expanding.  In recent seasons, the League has fielded up to 11 sides in Division One already.

Divisional Football

League president Andrew Foley said splitting the 11-team competition into two divisions for 2014, including the three current reserve grade sides, would help the newer clubs to be more competitive. The senior competition grew  last season with the formation of Chinchilla and South Burnett but those clubs struggled on-field .
First division has Coolaroo, Goondiwidi, Highfields, Lockyer Valley, South Toowoomba, Toowoomba, University and Warwick.
Second division has Chinchilla, Dalby, South Burnett as well as clubs seconds from Coolaroo, Highfields, South Toowoomba, University and Warwick.

2014 Ladder

See also

Australian Rules football in Queensland

References

External links

Australian rules football competitions in Queensland
Darling Downs